Pyrrhulina eleanorae is a species of fish in the Pyrrhulina genus found in the upper Amazon basin. They grow no more than a few centimeters.

Fish named in honor of Eleanor Morrow, the wife of William P. Morrow, who was the leader of the Peruvian expedition that collected the type specimen.

References

External links
 

Fish described in 1940
Taxa named by Henry Weed Fowler
Lebiasinidae
Fish of South America